Sultan Mansor Shah Secondary School (SMSS or SMKSMS) was founded on January 1, 1965, in Pulau Sebang, Malacca, Malaysia, and is named after Sultan Mansor Shah. The school has more than 700 students and more than seventy teachers.

References

External links
 School Website

1965 establishments in Malaysia
Educational institutions established in 1965
Schools in Malacca
Secondary schools in Malaysia